DNA polymerase epsilon catalytic subunit is an enzyme that in humans is encoded by the POLE gene.  It is the central catalytic subunit of DNA polymerase epsilon.

Clinical significance 

POLE, along with POLD1, has recently been associated with multiple adenoma.

Interactions
POLE has been shown to interact with RAD17.

References

Further reading